West Craven High School is a secondary school located in Vanceboro, North Carolina. Established in 1971, the school serves approximately 1100 students in grades 9–12.

History 
The school was opened in 1971, with the first graduating class graduating in the spring of 1976.
The school was built in the exact same style as inter county rival Havelock High School as Havelock was to have been originally named East Craven High School.

Extracurricular activities 

West Craven's athletic teams, known as the Eagles, compete in the North Carolina High School Athletic Association (NCHSAA) 2A classification, and in the Coastal Conference. Teams are fielded in baseball, basketball, cheerleading, cross country, football, golf, soccer, softball, tennis, volleyball, and wrestling. The Eagles have developed a longtime rivalry with New Bern High School, a 4-A high school located just 12 miles away from WCHS. The Eagles biggest rival, however, would be conference and cross county foe, Havelock High School.

The Eagles play their home football games in the on-campus stadium named for longtime head coach Clay Jordan. Clay Jordan Stadium was named so in 2008, Jordan's final season with the Eagles. The basketball court was also named after an important coach of the Eagles basketball team. In 2010, the gymnasium's court was named Lorenzo Jones Court, after the winningest men's basketball coach in WCHS history. The Baseball field is also named for an influential figure in WCHS sports, Don Hughes. Don Hughes played football at East Carolina University and returned to West Craven to teach physical education while helping coach football and baseball. His most influential work for the Eagles, however, came as principal of the school.

Notable alumni 
 
 Shawn Armstrong, former MLB pitcher
 Jesse Campbell, former NFL safety
 Justin Hardy, former NFL wide receiver
 Roland Hooks, former NFL running back
 George Koonce, former NFL linebacker, Super Bowl XXXI with the Green Bay Packers
 Beth Wood, 17th Auditor of North Carolina, first female state auditor
 Anthony Wright, former NFL quarterback

References

External links 
 West Craven Athletics
 West Craven Band

Educational institutions established in 1971
Public high schools in North Carolina
Schools in Craven County, North Carolina